The National Archives is the central archive institution of the Czech Republic. It depends on the Ministry of the Interior. The institution have documents dating to the Early Middle Ages. It is located in Prague.

Famous documents
 Golden Bull of Sicily (1212)
 Zemské desky

See also
 National Library of the Czech Republic
 Prague City Archives
 List of national archives

External links
 Official website

Czech Republic
Czech culture
Archives in the Czech Republic
Chodov (Prague)